Crnokosa (Serbian Cyrillic: Црнокоса) is a mountain in western Serbia, near the town of Kosjerić. It runs around 9 km along the Skrapež river, steeply closing its southern valley, while its southern slopes are milder.

References

Mountains of Serbia